Paul Brigham (January 1746June 15, 1824) was an American Revolutionary soldier and Democratic-Republican politician. He was the second lieutenant governor of Vermont after that state was admitted to the Union in 1791, and upon the death of Vermont's first governor Thomas Chittenden, served as governor for the last seven weeks of Chittenden's term. (During the 14 years before admission to the Union, when Vermont was a largely unrecognized state, several others served as lieutenant governor and two persons served as governor.)

Biography
Brigham, son of Paul and Catherine (Turner) Brigham, was born in January 1746, in Coventry in the Colony of Connecticut. The exact date of his birth varies from source to source. Some give his birthday as January 6; others give it as January 17. He married Lydia Sawyer (of Hebron, Connecticut) on October 3, 1767, and the couple had five children.

Career
Brigham served from January 1, 1777 to April 22, 1781 as a captain in the Connecticut Militia during the American Revolutionary War. He was a company commander of Continental troops under the command of General George Washington  and wintered in Valley Forge during the winter of 1777.

In the spring of 1782 Brigham and his family moved to Norwich, Vermont, where he was a farmer and a land speculator. He served as high sheriff of Windsor County, Vermont, for five years and as major general of the Vermont Militia. He was chief judge of the county court for five years, and was a presidential elector for Vermont in 1792. He was on the Governor's Council from 1793 to 1796.

Brigham was annually elected lieutenant governor of Vermont for 16 consecutive years, from 1796 to 1813; only the brief Federalist resurgence removed Brigham and other Republicans from office. After conclusion to the War of 1812, which gave life to the moribund Federalist Party all across New England for their opposition, Brigham was again lieutenant governor, this time from 1815 until 1820. Upon the death of Governor Thomas Chittenden, he served for a short time as the second Governor of Vermont from August 25 to October 16, 1797, when the new governor, Isaac Tichenor was sworn in. Brigham then resumed his duties as lieutenant governor. He retired and returned to his home in Norwich in 1820.

Death and legacy
Brigham died in Norwich on June 16, 1824.  He was interred at Fairview Cemetery in his hometown of Norwich. The journal of his army experiences was published as A Revolutionary Diary of Captain Paul Brigham, November 19, 1777 – September 4, 1778.

The obituary from the New-Hampshire Patriot (NH), July 12, 1824, p. 3, reads:

References

External links
 
Information from the Vermont Archives
Political Graveyard
A History of Norwich Vermont by M. E. Goddard & H. V. Partridge

National Governors Association

1746 births
1824 deaths
People from Coventry, Connecticut
Vermont Democratic-Republicans
Governors of Vermont
Lieutenant Governors of Vermont
People from Norwich, Vermont
Vermont militiamen in the American Revolution
Vermont state court judges
People of pre-statehood Vermont
Vermont sheriffs
Burials in Vermont
Democratic-Republican Party state governors of the United States
People of colonial Connecticut
People of Vermont in the American Revolution